Aix-en-Provence Aerodrome , also known as Aix les Milles Airport (Aéroport Aix les Milles), is an airport serving Aix-en-Provence, a commune in the Bouches-du-Rhône department of the Provence-Alpes-Côte d'Azur region of France.

It formerly served as a military air base, known as Base Aerienne 114 d'Aix Les Milles. A campus of the École nationale de l'aviation civile (French civil aviation university) is also located at the aerodrome.

Facilities

See also
 List of French Air Force bases

References

External links
  CCI Marseille Provence
  Aéro-Club Aix - Marseille
  Aéroclub Provence Aviation
  Aéroclub A.A.A.
  Aéroclub du Soleil

Airports in Provence-Alpes-Côte d'Azur
Buildings and structures in Bouches-du-Rhône